Eria javanica is a species of orchid, which is a plant. It is the type species of the genus Eria. It is widespread from Sikkim east to Taiwan, and through much of Southeast Asia to New Guinea.

References

javanica
Orchids of Asia
Flora of East Himalaya
Flora of China
Flora of Taiwan
Flora of Indo-China
Flora of Malesia
Plants described in 1805